Turovo is a rural locality (a selo) in Seletskoye Rural Settlement, Suzdalsky District, Vladimir Oblast, Russia. The population was 5 as of 2010.

Geography 
Turovo is located 12 km north of Suzdal (the district's administrative centre) by road. Malo-Boriskovo is the nearest rural locality.

References 

Rural localities in Suzdalsky District